Peter Kerr (born 26 February 1948) is a former Australian rules footballer who played with Carlton in the Victorian Football League (VFL). His father, Laurie Kerr, also played in the VFL.

Notes

External links 

Peter Kerr's profile at Blueseum

1948 births
Carlton Football Club players
Australian rules footballers from Victoria (Australia)
Living people